The 3rd Golden Globe Awards, honoring the best achievements in 1945 filmmaking, were announced 6 March and held 30 March 1946 at the Knickerbocker Hotel (Los Angeles) in Los Angeles, California.

Winners

Best Picture 
 The Lost Weekend directed by Billy Wilder

Best Actor in a Leading Role 
 Ray Milland - The Lost Weekend

Best Actress in a Leading Role 
 Ingrid Bergman - The Bells of St. Mary's

Best Performance by an Actor in a Supporting Role in a Motion Picture 
 J. Carrol Naish - A Medal for Benny

Best Performance by an Actress in a Supporting Role in a Motion Picture 
 Angela Lansbury - The Picture of Dorian Gray

Best Director-Motion Picture 
 Billy Wilder - The Lost Weekend

Best Film Promoting International Understanding
 The House I Live In

See also
 Hollywood Foreign Press Association
 18th Academy Awards
 1945 in film

References

003
1945 film awards
1945 television awards
January 1946 events in the United States